Veli Peak is a peak just east of Idun Peak and 1 nautical mile (1.9 km) south of Brunhilde Peak in the Asgard Range of Victoria Land. The precise origin of "Veli," applied by New Zealand Antarctic Place-Names Committee (NZ-APC), is not known.

Mountains of the Asgard Range
McMurdo Dry Valleys